Kit for Cat is a 1948 Looney Tunes cartoon directed by Friz Freleng. The short was released on November 6, 1948 and features Elmer Fudd and Sylvester.

Plot 

The cartoon begins with Sylvester in an alley, strolling past the line of trash cans as if he is at a buffet, trying to find bits of appetizing food; a kitten arrives and starts doing the same, Sylvester yells at him that, "Say, listen, small fry, I'm working this side of the street! Now scram!" before he throws the kitten away, adding "Go on, beat it! Get lost!" The weather is freezing and snowy; Sylvester finds a house and bangs on the door, begging for shelter. He falls down, "Please, save a frost-bitten feline from a frozen fate!", when Elmer Fudd answers the door.  Elmer sits Sylvester in a comfortable chair near the fireplace and tells the cat to consider this his home. More banging on the door is revealed to be the kitten, who also falls down 'frozen' when Elmer opens the door. Elmer tells them  "Dear me, two cats! I'd wike to have a cat awound the house alwight, but I can't keep both of ya...", but he cannot keep both of them. He decides to sleep on it and Elmer shows more interest in the kitten, Sylvester tries to act like a baby, but Fudd is disappointed by Sylvester's way of acting when he's grown-up, labelling it "a widicuwous way for a gwown-up cat to behave," and tells him to "act your age". Elmer decides "Well, maybe I'd better sweep on it and make up my mind in the morning" much to Sylvester's chagrin, choose in the morning which one gets to stay.

Sylvester then imagines ways to get rid of his competition; he decides to frame the kitten by pouring all the milk in the fridge on him and then dropping the bottle, making it look like the kitten did it. Elmer observes, "What's going on here? Did you do that?", Elmer thinks the kitten has done it by accident saying "Aww, the poor wittle fewwa, you must be starved. How negwectful of me." because he must be very hungry, and doles out a large meal to him. Next, the kitten plays with a ball of string, but Sylvester has tied the end to a stack of glasses and dishes. Soon, the kitten pulls enough on the string that the entire stack falls and breaks. The kitten quickly tries to glue them back together, but Sylvester breaks every one that is fixed. It's Sylvester who Elmer catches in the act, and he tells him, "So, bweaking my dishes? You're making it vewy much easier for me to make up my mind which one of you to keep!" Sylvester points the cat that he is making it very easy for him to make up his mind which of them to keep.

Sylvester hypnotizes the kitten, leads him to Elmer's bedroom, provides the kitten with a baseball bat and instructs him to hit the sleeping Elmer on the head; the kitten misinterprets Sylvester's visual instruction and hits Sylvester instead, causing the dazed cat to climb into bed with Elmer. Elmer wakes up, throws Sylvester  down the stairs and warns him he will be held responsible for the next disturbance. Sylvester sets a wind-up mouse toy loose and the kitten chases it, following it into a mouse hole. Sylvester nails a piece of wood to the mouse hole. From behind the walls, however, the kitten starts knocking out the nails holding up paintings and shelves hanging on walls. Sylvester, remembering Elmer's warning, tries to catch all of the falling objects as the kitten (still trapped in the walls) makes his way upstairs. The chandelier above Elmer's bed crashes to the floor before Sylvester can stop it. Elmer, awakened again, issues a final ultimatum. If Sylvester so much as makes one more peep, he is out of the house for good.

The kitten, having overheard, takes advantage and starts making a huge racket. Sylvester places a pair of earmuffs on the sleeping Elmer, in an attempt to drown out the kitten's noise (which involves a shotgun, a parade drum, and a slamming door). Infuriated, Sylvester literally blows his top and begins chasing the kitten; panicking, the kitten turns the radio on full-blast, activates the coin-operated pianola and proceeds to make noise in a variety of other ways. The earmuffs fail, and Elmer runs down the stairs yelling that he has "made up [his] mind who's weaving these pwemises!"; however, he is interrupted by a knock at the door—Elmer's landlord serves him an eviction notice, presumably due to the excess noise {"In other words GET OUT!"}. The cartoon ends with Sylvester, the kitten, and Elmer looking for food in the trash alley.

Home media
 VHS: Wideo Wabbit (1998 "THIS VERSION" with original opening, credits, and ending titles restored, with notice)
 DVD: Looney Tunes Golden Collection: Volume 1, Disc 4 (1998 "THIS VERSION" with original opening, credits, but with Blue Ribbon ending, without notice); Looney Tunes Spotlight Collection" Volume 1, Disc 2 (1998 "THIS VERSION" with original opening, credits, but with Blue Ribbon ending, without notice)

References

External links
 

1948 films
1948 animated films
1948 short films
Looney Tunes shorts
Elmer Fudd films
Sylvester the Cat films
Short films directed by Friz Freleng
Films scored by Carl Stalling
Warner Bros. Cartoons animated short films
1940s Warner Bros. animated short films
Films with screenplays by Michael Maltese